The Geelong Amateur Football & Netball Club, nicknamed the Ammos', is an Australian rules football and netball club situated in the regional city of Geelong, Victoria, Australia.

GAFNC teams currently play in the Bellarine Football League.

History 
The Geelong Amateur Football Club was formed in 1926 as a result of teachers and students from The Geelong College and The Geelong Grammar forming a football team to play in Victorian Amateur Football Association. Hence the green (College)and light blue (Grammar) colors and the Pegasus Logo of the club.

They moved to their current home at Queens Park, Highton in 1957.

They started in the VAFA  participating as high as A Grade before in 1983 the club decided to base itself in Geelong and joined the Geelong and District Football League. Playing in the V.A.F.A. meant travelling to Melbourne every fortnight, whereas joining the Geelong & District Football League meant that all games were played locally.

In 1985 they won the GDFL premiership. The club then briefly went up to the Geelong Football League but was unable to sustain itself there and moved back to the GDFL in 1989.

The club experienced a period of troubled times over the next few years and, after much soul searching and survival meetings, in 1995 the club joined the Bellarine Football League and has remained since.

Premierships (9)
Victorian Amateur Football Association
1931, 1953, 1966, 1972
Geelong & District Football League
 1985
Bellarine Football League
 2004, 2008, 2014, 2015, 2016

League awards

League Best & Fairest
	2001 Mark Trevaskis 
	2009 Lindsay Smith

League Leading Goalkickers
	2010 Jason Tom  89
	2011 Jason Tom 120
       2015 Mitchell Day 114
       2016 Mitchell Day 87

Notable players

VFL/AFL players
Graeme Linke with Geelong and Footscray.
David Clarke with Geelong and Carlton.
Tim Clarke with Hawthorn.
Spiro Malakellis with Geelong
Tony Malakellis with Geelong and Sydney Swans.
Ben Bucovaz with Fremantle
Josh Saunders with St Kilda
Mason Wood with North Melbourne
Hugh Goddard with St Kilda
Peter Featherby with Footscray 1975–76 and Geelong 1979–83

Other
Lindsay Hassett (Test cricketer)
Ian Redpath (Test cricketer)

Bibliography 
 Cat Country: History of Football in the Geelong Region by John Stoward – Aussie Footy Books, 2008 –

References

External links
 Official website

Bellarine Football League
Sports clubs established in 1926
Australian rules football clubs established in 1926
1926 establishments in Australia
Victorian Amateur Football Association clubs
Geelong Football League clubs
Geelong & District Football League clubs
Netball teams in Geelong
Geelong Grammar School
Geelong College
Australian rules football clubs in Geelong